Sir James Hay Wallace  (born 23 November 1937) is a New Zealand businessman and arts patron. He amassed a collection of New Zealand art that he transferred to the James Wallace Art Trust in 1992, and is now displayed at the Pah Homestead in Auckland. Also in 1992, he established the Wallace Art Awards for New Zealand artists. Wallace is currently funding the restoration of earthquake-damaged McLean's Mansion in Christchurch, New Zealand's largest timber house.

Early life and family
Wallace was born in Cambridge on 23 November 1937, the son of James Dunning Wallace and Frances Lindsay Wallace (née Hay). His father was a pig farmer and agricultural contractor who, in 1937, founded a small rendering company, J. D. Wallace Limited, that would eventually become the Wallace Corporation. James Dunning Wallace was appointed an Officer of the Order of the British Empire, for services to farming, in the 1994 Birthday Honours.

Wallace was educated at King's College, Auckland, from 1951 to 1955, and won a scholarship to study for his last year of secondary school in Boston, during which time he developed his interest in art and opera. He went on to study law, graduating with a Bachelor of Laws degree from Auckland University College in 1961. He gained international experience working in New York for a year, and worked for Robert Kerridge at Rank/Hanimex and Woolf Fisher at Fisher & Paykel, before joining the family business.

Business career
Wallace joined his father's rendering business, J. D. Wallace Limited, while his younger brother David partnered with their father in farm contracting and cattle and dairy farming operations as J. D. and R. D. Wallace Limited. J. D. Wallace took over other rendering companies, and Wallace established other rural services companies Wallford Meats (NZ) Limited, Eureka Hides and Skins Limited, and Wallace Industries Limited, which were amalgamated as Wallace Corporation Limited (WCL) in 1994. In 2007, WCL was reported to employ 600 staff seasonally and had an annual turnover of about $200 million. In 2017, WCL merged its meat co-products businesses with Farm Brands Limited, to form Wallace Group Limited Partnership. The merger excluded WCL's farms, investments in biopolymer companies, and its Chilean dairying operation.

Arts patronage
Wallace began collecting art in the 1960s, with a focus on young and emerging New Zealand artists. His first acquisition was a Toss Woollaston watercolour in 1964. In 1992, he established the James Wallace Arts Trust, to which he transferred ownership of his collection, which by 2020 held over 9000 pieces. In 2010, the collection moved from Wallace's home to the Pah Homestead in the Auckland suburb of Hillsborough.

In 1992, Wallace founded the Wallace Art Awards, the richest awards, mostly as overseas residencies, for New Zealand artists. The James Wallace Arts Trust injects about $2 million dollars into the arts in New Zealand annually, including new acquisitions and over $200,000 for the Wallace Art Awards. Wallace has been involved with the trust that aims to restore earthquake-damaged McLean's Mansion in Christchurch since 2016. In 2022, it was reported that he had taken the chairmanship of the trust and financed the restoration of the building, which is expected to open to the public in 2024.

Honours and awards
In the 2001 New Year Honours, Wallace was appointed an Officer of the New Zealand Order of Merit, for services to the arts. He was promoted to Knight Companion of the New Zealand Order of Merit, also for services to the arts, in the 2011 Queen's Birthday Honours.

In December 2018, Wallace was conferred with an honorary doctorate by Auckland University of Technology. In 2019, he received an honorary Master of Arts degree from the Waikato Institute of Technology.

References

1937 births
Living people
People from Cambridge, New Zealand
People educated at King's College, Auckland
University of Auckland alumni
Knights Companion of the New Zealand Order of Merit
New Zealand philanthropists
Patrons of the arts